Poland first participated at the Paralympic Games in 1972.

Polish athletes have won a total of 799 medals. Before the 2012 Games, Poland is ninth on the all-time Paralympic Games medal table.

Medal tables

Medals by Summer Games

Medals by Winter Games

Multi-medalists
Athletes who have won at least three gold medals or five medals of any colour.

See also
 Poland at the Olympics

References